Pang Chiu Yin (born 12 October 1995) is a Hong Kong footballer who currently plays as a midfielder  for Hong Kong Second Division club Kowloon City. 

Before becoming a footballer, he worked as an airport security guard.

Club career
Yuen Long revealed that they had signed Pang on 10 August 2019. He announced on 29 May 2020, that as a result of the club's financial struggles, he would leave after his contract expired.

Honours

Club
Yuen Long
 Hong Kong Senior Shield: 2017–18

References

External links

HKFA

1995 births
Living people
Hong Kong footballers
Association football midfielders
Happy Valley AA players
Yuen Long FC players
Dreams Sports Club players
Hong Kong Premier League players